The Fusion Pilot Plant is a program initiated in 2021 by the United States Department of Energy to construct a pilot plant capable of producing net electrical fusion power by the 2030s. In September 2022, $50 million was earmarked by the Department of Energy for development of a pilot fusion power plant. The National Academies of Sciences, Engineering and Medicine was involved in kicking off the program and advised it become a United States public-private partnership.

General Fusion received an award in July 2022 to study tritium production for the pilot plant startup. 
In October 2022, General Atomics announced it would compete to construct the plant, citing its success operating the DIII-D tokamak, and expressed an interest in siting it in Southern California.

See also

DEMOnstration Power Plant
Experimental Breeder Reactor I, first U.S. nuclear reactor to produce electricity

References

Further reading

External links
Validated Design & Evaluation of Fusion Wall Components Initiative, Oak Ridge National Laboratory Fusion and Fission Energy and Science Directorate
Compact fusion pilot plant, General Atomics

Proposed nuclear power stations in the United States
Proposed fusion reactors
Tokamaks